The Dajnko alphabet was a Slovene alphabet invented by Peter Dajnko. It was used from 1824 to 1839 mostly in Styria (in what is now eastern Slovenia).

History
Dajnko introduced his alphabet in 1824 in his book Lehrbuch der windischen Sprache (Slovene Textbook). He decided to replace the older Bohorič alphabet with his own new writing system because of the problems with the writing of sibilants. In 1825, Franc Serafin Metelko came up with a similar proposal, complicating the issue. The Dajnko alphabet, which was introduced to schools in 1831, was fiercely opposed by Anton Murko and Anton Martin Slomšek. After 1834 it gradually came out of use with the adoption of a slightly modified version of Gaj's Latin alphabet as the new Slovene script and was in 1839 officially abolished.

Letters
In addition, he invented two extra symbols, which were omitted after 1829 (see table below):

Dajnko's alphabetical order was as follows:

The IETF language tags have assigned the variant  to Slovene in the Dajnko alphabet.

References

Slovene alphabet
Writing systems introduced in the 19th century